Floods of 1341 is a deluge that occurred in present-day Kerala during the 14th century. There are no written historic treatise regarding this event. The present day understanding regarding this event is centered around findings of Pattanam Archaeological excavations in Kodungallur - North Paravur region and geological studies about Vypin and Fort Kochi.

Aftermath 
It is widely believed that excess siltation caused due to run off from Western Ghats through Periyar River during the floods had led to change in the course of Periyar and destruction of ancient natural port of Muziris. The accretion following the deluge has brought in tremendous changes to the shore between Alappuzha and Kodungallur. It has resulted in rejuvenation of new land masses like Vypin Island and soil deposits along Panangad - Kumbalam region. There are many historians who attribute the floods as a major reason for formation of Cochin Port and estuary on Vembanad.

See also 
 Kerala floods (disambiguation page)
 2020 Kerala floods
 Great flood of 99

References 

Floods in India
History of Kerala
Periyar (river)
Disasters in Kerala
Floods in Kerala